Kerala's 14 revenue districts in 2015 were further divided into 6 municipal corporations, 87 municipalities and 941 grama panchayats.
{
  "type": "ExternalData",
  "service": "geoshape",
  "properties": {
    "fill": "#32CD32",
    "stroke": "#0000ff",
    "stroke-width": 2
  },
  "query": "\nSELECT ?id ?idLabel (concat('', ?idLabel, '') as ?title) WHERE\n{\n?id wdt:P31 wd:Q6936225. # is a district\n?id wdt:P361 wd:Q17069989.\nSERVICE wikibase:label { bd:serviceParam wikibase:language 'en'.\n?id rdfs:label ?idLabel .\n}\n}"}

History 
The urban councils of Kerala date back to the 17th century when the Dutch Malabar established the municipality of Fort Kochi. 
In 1664, the municipality of Fort Kochi was established by Dutch Malabar, making it the first municipality in Indian subcontinent, which got dissolved when the Dutch authority got weaker in 18th century. However, the first modern kind of municipalities were formed in the state in 1866 in Malabar District. In 1866, Fort Kochi municipality was reestablished. Kannur, Thalassery, Kozhikode, Palakkad, and Fort Kochi, which were parts of Malabar District until 1956, were made the first modern municipalities of Kerala on 1 November 1866, according to the Madras Act 10 of 1865 (Amendment of the Improvements in Towns act 1850) of the British Indian Empire. The Thiruvananthapuram Municipality came into existence in 1920. After two decades, during the reign of Sree Chithira Thirunal, Thiruvananthapuram Municipality was converted into Corporation on 30 October 1940, making it the oldest Municipal Corporation of Kerala. The first Municipal Corporation formed after the independence of India as well as the second-oldest Municipal Corporation of the state is Kozhikode Municipal Corporation established in the year 1962.

Municipal Corporations 
There are six Municipal Corporations in Kerala: 2 in South Kerala, 2 in Central Kerala and 2 in North Kerala.

See also

 Taluks of Kerala
 Municipalities of Kerala

References

Sources 
Government of Kerala
List Of Corporations And Municipalities of Kerala – www.c4civil.com
Kerala at a glance
Local Self Government Department, Government of Kerala

Kerala politics-related lists
Municipal corporations